The Omloop der Vlaamse gewesten was a men's cycling race of which the original format was organized for the last time in 1972. The race was run in variating Flemish provinces or Brussels.

The competition's roll of honor includes the successes of Rik Van Steenbergen, Briek Schotte and Rik Van Looy.

In overlapping years and afterwards, races with the same name were also organized for amateur and junior cyclists. The final editions were held in Wuustwezel, Antwerp.

Winners

Winners amateur and junior races

References 

Cycle races in Belgium
1928 establishments in Belgium
Defunct cycling races in Belgium
Recurring sporting events established in 1928